The 2007 Northern Illinois Huskies football team represented Northern Illinois University as a member of the West Division of the Mid-American Conference (MAC) during the 2007 NCAA Division I FBS football season. Led by Joe Novak in his 12th and final season as head coach, the Huskies compiled an overall record of 2–10 with a mark of 1–6 in conference play, placing last out of six teams in the MAC's West Division. Northern Illinois played home games at Huskie Stadium in DeKalb, Illinois.

Novak retired after the season.

Schedule

References

Northern Illinois
Northern Illinois Huskies football seasons
Northern Illinois Huskies football